The 1967 Far East Circuit was the sixth season of golf tournaments that comprised the Far East Circuit, later known as the Asia Golf Circuit.

Lu Liang-Huan of Taiwan was the overall circuit champion.

Schedule
The table below shows the 1967 Far East Circuit schedule. There were no changes from the previous season except for the addition of two "associate events", the Indian Open and the Kenya Open, which did not count towards the circuit prize.

Final standings
The Far East Circuit standings were based on a points system.

References

Far East Circuit
Asia Golf Circuit